H&P may refer to:
Medical history
Physical examination
Henley & Partners